
Gmina Potęgowo is a rural gmina (administrative district) in Słupsk County, Pomeranian Voivodeship, in northern Poland.

Neighbouring gminas
Gmina Potęgowo is bordered by the gminas of Cewice, Czarna Dąbrówka, Damnica, Dębnica Kaszubska, Główczyce and Nowa Wieś Lęborska.

Villages
Gmina Potęgowo includes the villages and settlements of Chlewnica, Czerwieniec, Dąbrówno, Darżynko, Darżyno, Gaje, Głuszynko, Głuszyno, Grąbkowo, Grapice, Grapiczki, Huta, Karznica, Łupawa, Malczkówko, Malczkowo, Nieckowo, Nowa Dąbrowa, Nowe Skórowo, Nowina, Piaseczno, Poganice, Potęgowo, Radosław, Rębowo, Runowo, Rzechcinko, Rzechcino, Skórowo, Warcimino, Węgierskie, Wieliszewo, Żochówko, Żochowo and Żychlin.

References
Polish official population figures 2006

Potegowo
Słupsk County